Mrs. Thompson is a 1919 British silent drama film directed by Rex Wilson and starring Minna Grey, C. M. Hallard and Isobel Elsom. It was released in the United States on 6 April 1923. It was adapted from a 1911 novel by William Babington Maxwell.

Cast
 Minna Grey - Mrs. Thompson
 C. M. Hallard - Prentice
 Isobel Elsom - Enid Thompson
 Bertram Burleigh - Dicky Marsden
 Tom Reynolds - Archibald Bence
 James Lindsay - Charles Kennion
 Marie Wright - Yates
 Wyndham Guise - Mears

References

External links

1919 films
1919 drama films
Films directed by Rex Wilson
Films based on British novels
British silent feature films
British drama films
British black-and-white films
1910s English-language films
1910s British films
Silent drama films